Persian melons (Persian: خربزه) are cultivars of  Cucumis melo, a type of melon, also called Odessa melons. They are elongate, unridged, with dark green skin with irregular yellowish bands, and flesh of a deep green colour.

References

Melons